Britaldo Silveira Soares Filho is a Brazilian scientist, and Professor in Environment Modeling at Universidade Federal de Minas Gerais.  Britaldo  is one of winners of the Georg Foster Research Awards because "he has developed innovative methods in the field of geography and cartography which make it possible to precisely predict how tropical rainforests – such as in the Amazon basin – will develop. Based on these models, the government of Brazil has implemented a variety of protective measures and is planning more for the future."

Education 
 BA in Geology, Universidade Federal de Minas Gerais: March, 1978-December, 1982.
 MSc in Remote Sensing, Instituto Nacional de Pesquisas Espaciais – March 1987-November 1989.
 DSc in Spatial Analyses, Universidade de São Paulo – March, 1993-September, 1998.

Career 
Dr. Britaldo Silveira Soares-Filho is full professor of Department of Cartography since March 2012, Institute of Geosciences and the current coordinator of CSR (Remote Sensing Center) of Federal University of Minas Gerais (Universidade Federal de Minas Gerais), Brazil. He advises at the graduate courses on Production Engineering and Environmental Modeling of UFMG; of which he led the creation of the latter. Since 2000, he has collaborated in various research projects in the Amazon with IPAM (Instituto de Pesquisa Ambiental da Amazônia), Aliança da Terra, and the Woods Hole Research Center, where he is a distinguished visiting scientist. In addition, he is member of the scientific board of CTI (Center of Territorial Intelligence) and guest professor at Center for Development Research University of Bonn, Germany.

His research consists of environmental modeling, in particular, the development of simulation models of changes in land use and coverage, agricultural and forest profitability, urban dynamics, forest fire and carbon balance and their applications for the design of public policies and evaluation policies. An important product of his research is the DINAMICA EGO software, a platform for environmental modeling used by researchers from various countries like Mexico, Iran, Bangladesh, Greece, China and others.

Soares Filho participated in important projects to define public policies for environmental protection and conservation in Brazil, such as the Amazon Region Protected Areas Program, in which he is part of the Arpa Scientific Advisory Panel, and the environmental impact modeling studies of the implementation of BR 163 in the Amazon region

Awards 
 2007. IPCC fourth report, working group III, mitigation, contributing author, chapter 9, Forestry – IPCC was awarded jointly with Al Gore with the 2007 Nobel Peace Prize.
 2015. Georg Forster Research Award, The Alexander von Humboldt Foundation

References

External links 
 "Nature Sustainability publishes opinion of Professors Britaldo Soares Filho and Raoni Rajão on the strategies of environmental conservation in Brazil.", Nov 2018
 Britaldo Soareas Filho interview to Boletim UFMG
 Britaldo Soareas Filho interview to Estadão evaluate the repercussions of a possible merger between the Ministries of Agriculture and the Environment.
 Britaldo Soareas Filho video on 90th anniversary of University of Minas Gerais.
 In a presentation to the Federal Senate, Professor Britaldo Soares Filho discussed the advances of the environmental registry and tools to facilitate compliance with the Brazilian forest code.
 Lecture given by Frank Merry and Britaldo Soares-Filho for the Climate and Land Use Alliance - CLUA. July, 2017.
 Britaldo Soares Filho at Research gate.net
 Britaldo Soares Filho article to Climate Observatory web sit e "A encruzilhada das emissões do desmatamento".
 Britaldo Soares Filho interview to Vet UFMG on livestock productivity and the forest conservation. 
 Britaldo Soares Filho on Environmental modelling in support of sound policy development. 

 

 
Living people
Year of birth missing (living people)
Environmental scientists